Fowey railway station was a station in Fowey, Cornwall from 1874 until 1965. The rail connection to the docks at Carne Point remains open for china clay traffic.

History
The Lostwithiel and Fowey Railway (L&FR) had opened as far as Carne Point in 1869 but was never completed to the intended terminus at Fowey. The Cornwall Minerals Railway (CMR) arrived from the opposite direction in 1874. A passenger service from Fowey to  via  started on 1 June 1874.

The station had two platforms with loading docks and a goods shed at the St Blazey end. It was situated at Caffa Mill Pill on the north side of the town by the River Fowey. Goods trains from St Blazey passed through the station to the jetties where ships could be loaded directly from the wagons.

The L&FR ceased operations at the end of 1879 but on 16 September 1895 a connection was made from the CMR's line to the Lostwithiel line which was refurbished.

The advertised passenger service to Newquay was withdrawn on 8 July 1929, although unadvertised workmen's trains continued to run to St Blazey until 29 December 1934. The station was host to a GWR camp coach from 1934 to 1939. A camping coach was also positioned here by the Western Region from 1952 to 1962, the coach was replaced in 1963 by two Pullman camping coaches which were in turn replaced by two larger coaches for a final season in 1964.

The Great Western Railway was nationalised into British Railways on 1 January 1948.

China clay exports

The L&FR built a jetty at Carne Point and the CMR built three between there and the passenger station. By one had been modernised to allow rapid loading and a fifth was under construction. In 1919 double-shift working was introduced to relieve a backlog of export orders and 200 additional railway wagons brought into service. The fifth jetty was finally completed in 1921 at a cost of £200,000. By 1923 there were eight jetties, numbered 1 to 8 from the station to Carne Point.

By the time that English China Clays took over the facilities in 1968 only five jetties remained in use. The main jetty is n number 8 while numbers 4 and 6 could load china clay from rail wagons using conveyors. Number 5 only handled bagged china clay from road vehicles and number 3 handled liquid china clay slurry. Only number is now used for rail traffic. It was modernised in 1988 to allow it to handle new 32 tonne hopper wagons.

Closure and afterwards
The passenger service to Lostwithiel was withdrawn on 4 January 1965 and the remaining goods traffic from Par ceased on 1 July 1968. The railway was then converted into a private road to bring china clay from Par harbour. Reopening of the Lostwithiel line to passenger services was suggested in 2014.

The station has been demolished and the site is now a car park, although the original station house remains in the dock area.

References

External links
 Fowey station on navigable 1946 O. S. map

Disused railway stations in Cornwall
Former Great Western Railway stations
Railway stations in Great Britain opened in 1876
Railway stations in Great Britain closed in 1880
Railway stations in Great Britain opened in 1895
Railway stations in Great Britain closed in 1940
Railway stations in Great Britain opened in 1942
Railway stations in Great Britain closed in 1965
Beeching closures in England
1876 establishments in England
Fowey